Carl August Braun Jr. (September 25, 1927 – February 10, 2010) was an American professional basketball and baseball player and professional basketball coach.

Sports career
Born on Sept. 25, 1927, in Brooklyn, New York, Braun's family moved to Garden City for his senior year of high school. At 6'4" and 185 pounds he had talent as both a right-handed pitcher and as a basketball player. His high school nickname was "bean pole". As a senior at Garden City High School, he helped lead his team to their first-ever Nassau County baseball championship in 1945, and was a star basketball player; he was subsequently one of the inaugural inductees into the Nassau County High School Sports Hall of Fame. He enrolled in Colgate College and played collegiately for the Colgate University Raiders in 1945–1946. In the summer of 1947 was signed by the New York Yankees while still only 19 years old.  He played two seasons for Yankee farm teams in Sunbury, Pennsylvania, and then Amsterdam, New York, appearing in 35 games compiling a 2–3 won-lost record.

In between those minor league baseball seasons, he also joined the New York Knicks for their 1947–1948 season, effectively playing in two professional sports simultaneously.  On December 6, 1947, he set a then NBA single-game scoring record, recording 47 points. Incredibly he pitched one more season in the Yankees organization that following summer, until deciding that basketball was his future.

Braun was one of the premier guards of the 1950s and spent 13 seasons in the NBA, all but the last with the New York Knicks. Braun led the Knicks in scoring during his first seven seasons.  He did not play during the 1950–1951 or 1951–1952 seasons due to military service. He was named to the All-NBA Second Team in 1948 and 1954.  He ended his career in 1962, after one season with the Boston Celtics.  Braun played in five NBA All-Star Games and scored 10,625 points in his professional career.  Braun was a player-coach for the Knicks in 1960 and 1961 as well, compiling a 40–87 head coaching record.

Carl Braun is featured in the 1948 Bowman set of basketball cards, the 1957 Topps set, and the 1961 Fleer set. Though sportscaster Marty Glickman made the term "swish" a popular basketball colloquialism, he attributed the genesis of the word to Braun, who he heard say it following a good shot during warmup. Glickman used the term frequently in broadcasts throughout the 1950s.  Braun was elected to the National Basketball Hall of Fame in 2019.

Personal life
Braun was born in Brooklyn and moved to Garden City, New York as a teenager where he went to high school and lived most of his adult life. After retiring from professional sports, Braun was a Wall Street stockbroker. He retired to Florida around 1990. He married his wife Joan in 1952 with whom he had four daughters Susan, Patricia, Nancy and Carol, and six grandchildren.  He and Joan were married 58 years.

BAA/NBA career statistics

Regular season

Playoffs

See also
 Baseball in the United States
 Basketball in the United States

References

External links
BasketballReference.com: Carl Braun (as coach)
BasketballReference.com: Carl Braun (as player)

1927 births
2010 deaths
American men's basketball players
Basketball coaches from New York (state)
Basketball players from New York City
Boston Celtics players
Burials at the Cemetery of the Holy Rood
Colgate Raiders men's basketball players
Garden City High School (New York) alumni
Naismith Memorial Basketball Hall of Fame inductees
National Basketball Association broadcasters
National Basketball Association All-Stars
New York Knicks head coaches
New York Knicks players
Player-coaches
Point guards
Shooting guards
Sportspeople from Brooklyn
Undrafted National Basketball Association players
Jewish American sportspeople
21st-century American Jews